The 1500 meters distance for women in the 2012–13 ISU Speed Skating World Cup was contested over six races on six occasions, out of a total of nine World Cup occasions for the season, with the first occasion taking place in Heerenveen, Netherlands, on 16–18 November 2012, and the final occasion also taking place in Heerenveen on 8–10 March 2013.

Marrit Leenstra of the Netherlands won the cup, while the defending champion, Christine Nesbitt of Canada, came second, and Ireen Wüst of the Netherlands came third.

Top three

Race medallists

Standings 
''Standings as of 10 March 2013 (end of the season).

References 

Women 1500